Upper Burlington is a community in the Canadian province of Nova Scotia, located in the Municipality of West Hants .

References
 Upper Burlington on Destination Nova Scotia

Communities in Hants County, Nova Scotia
General Service Areas in Nova Scotia